Harvest is a futuristic dystopian play by Manjula Padmanabhan about organ-selling in India. It was first published in 1997 by Kali for Women.

The play takes place in a future Bombay in 2010. Om Prakash, a jobless Indian, agrees to sell unspecified organs through InterPlanta Services, Inc. to a rich person for a small fortune.  InterPlanta and the recipients are obsessed with maintaining Om's health and invasively control the lives of Om, his mother Ma, and his wife Jaya in their one-room apartment.  The recipient, Ginni, periodically looks in on them via videophone and treats them condescendingly.  Om's diseased brother Jeetu is taken to give organs instead of Om.

Harvest won the 1997 Onassis Prize as the best new international play. The playtext was included in Black and Asian Plays, published by Aurora Metro Books in 2000.

Reception
Backstage reviewed a production of the play, describing it as "... a fascinating, funny, and frightening glimpse of what happens when we commodify human beings." India Today wrote in 1998 "Savage, swiftian and with humour so black that what little laughter it provokes is painful, Manjula Padmanabhan's award-winning play is really an allegory about relationships." The New York Times reviewed a 2006 production of the play in New York City, writing that while the play was "well written" with an "engaging premise," it did not "totally deliver," in part because the plot grew too complicated.

References

Indian plays
Plays set in India